Mass media in Spain includes a variety of online, print, and broadcast formats, such as radio, television, newspapers, and magazines.

Mass media groups 
A list of the main mass media groups is presented as follows:

Books

Magazines

Many in Spain read ¡Hola!.

Newspapers

The most widely read newspaper in Spain is El Pais.

Radio

Television

Internet 
Spain has a high level of internet connectivity, with over 90% of the population having access to the internet as of 2020. Fixed broadband coverage is also high, with over 80% of the population having access, and mobile broadband coverage is also relatively high, with over 50% of the population having access. There are several providers of fixed and mobile broadband services, including Movistar, Orange, Vodafone, and MÁSMÓVIL. The government of Spain does not generally restrict access to the internet, but there have been complaints about internet censorship related to the narrowing of the definition of fair use. In general, the government respects freedom of speech and press, but there are laws in place to prohibit the dissemination of certain types of information, such as hate speech.

See also 
 Cinema of Spain
 Telecommunications in Spain
 
 Spanish literature
 
 Open access in Spain

References

Bibliography
in English
 Alonso, Paul. Hybrid Alternative Digital-Native Media in Latin America during the Pandemic: Two Peruvian Cases of Entrepreneurial Journalism Hosted from Spain. Journal of Latin American Communication Research, 2022.
 
  (includes broadcasting)
 
 
 

in Spanish

External links

 
Spain
Spain